Compact toroids are a class of toroidal plasma configurations that are self-stable, and whose configuration does not require magnet coils running through the center of the toroid. They are studied primarily in the field of fusion energy, where the lack of complex magnets and a simple geometry may allow the construction of dramatically simpler and less expensive fusion reactors.

The two best studied compact toroids are the spheromak and field-reversed configuration (FRC). A third configuration, the particle ring, does not appear to have attractive performance.

A CT containment system for plasma asymmetrically toroidally shaped by the containment, was first introduced into thought as a concept by Alfvén. The two examplar types; Field-reversed configuration plasma with a null toroid, firstly, is generally produced by prolate-theta-pinches with the necessarily existing field condition where the field magnetic bias is in a reversed situation. The second type has a non-null toroid, known as a spheromak configuration, is similar in arrangement to a smoke ring. The FRC is also toroidal, but extended into a tubular shape or hollow cylinder. The main difference between the two is that the spheromak contains poloidal (vertical rings) and toroidal (horizontal) magnetic fields, while the FRC has only the poloidal fields and requires an external magnet for confinement. In both cases the combination of electrical currents and their associated magnetic fields result in a series of closed magnetic lines that maintains the ring shape, without the need for magnets in the center of the plasma (unlike a tokamak).

Of the two, the FRC naturally has a higher beta, a measure of fusion economics. However, the spheromak had generated better confinement times and temperatures, and recent work suggests that great advances in performance can be made.

Compact toroids are also similar to the spherical tokamak, and many spherical tokamak machines were converted from earlier spheromak reactors.

See also
 High beta fusion reactor

References

Bibliography

 (Physics), "Physics through the 1990s", National Academies Press, 1986
 Charles Hartman, "Fusion-Reactor Aspects of the Compact Torus", Lawrence Livermore Laboratory, 11 March 1981
 "ProtoSphera, General Framework", CR-ENEA Frascati, July 2001

Fusion power